Falkland may refer to:

 Falkland, British Columbia, a community in Canada
 Falkland, Nova Scotia, a community in Canada
 Falkland Islands, an archipelago in the south Atlantic Ocean
 Falkland, Fife, a former burgh in Fife, Scotland
 Falkland Palace, royal residence of the Kings of Scots in Falkland, Fife, Scotland
 Viscount Falkland, a Scottish peerage title, named after Falkland, Fife, Scotland
 Falkland, North Carolina, a town in the United States
 Falkland (Redd Shop, Virginia), U.S., a historic plantation house
 Falkland (novel), an 1827 novel by  Edward Bulwer-Lytton

See also

 Falkland Ridge, Nova Scotia, a community in Canada
 Falkland Sound, a strait separating West Falkland and East Falkland
 South Falkland, an English colony on Newfoundland
 
 
 Folkland (disambiguation)
 Malvinas (disambiguation)
 Malvina (disambiguation)